The San Antonio Formation is a middle to late Pleistocene (Irvingtonian in the NALMA classification) geologic formation in California. It preserves fossils.

Fossil content 

 Equus sp.
 Odocoileus sp.
 Orthodon sp.
 Rana sp.
 Taricha sp.
 Aves indet.
 Colubridae indet.
 Emydinae indet.
 Sciuridae indet.

See also 

 List of fossiliferous stratigraphic units in California
 Paleontology in California

References

Further reading 
 R. W. Casteel and J. H. Hutchison. 1973. Orthodon (Actinopterygii, Cyprinidae) from the Pliocene and Pleistocene of California. Copeia 2:358-361

Geologic formations of California
Fossiliferous stratigraphic units of the United States
Pleistocene United States
Irvingtonian